Chester Allan Poage (July 4, 1980 – March 13, 2000) was an American man who was kidnapped, tortured, and murdered by three men in Spearfish, South Dakota, on March 13, 2000. Elijah Page, Briley Piper, and Darrell Hoadley were convicted of the torture and murder of Poage. Page and Piper were sentenced to death, while Hoadley was sentenced to life in prison. Page was executed by lethal injection on July 11, 2007, becoming the first person to be executed in South Dakota since 1947. Piper remains on death row, and is the only person left on death row in South Dakota.

Background
Chester Allan Poage was born on July 4, 1980, in Norton County, Kansas. He grew up on a farm just outside Norton, but moved with his family to Rapid City, South Dakota in 1994. In 1996, his father committed suicide, just days after his parents had filed for divorce. The family moved back to Norton, but later moved to Spearfish, South Dakota while Poage was at college. Prior to his death, Poage was attending Northwest Kansas Technical School, and was a half-year from graduating in communications technology.

Murder
On the evening of March 12, 2000, Page, Piper, and Hoadley met up with Poage at his family home in Spearfish. The four of them were friends, and had met up to play video games together. Poage's mother and sister were in Florida on vacation at the time, meaning that the house was empty. Later on, the four of them left the house, and drove in Poage's Chevrolet Blazer to the house where Page, Piper, and Hoadley were staying. Once inside, Page produced a .22 caliber pistol, which he had stolen from Poage's home, and ordered Poage to get on the floor. The three men planned to rob Poage's family home, and did not want a witness to the crime. As Poage lay on the floor, he was kicked repeatedly by Piper until he was unconscious. He was then tied up with a cord and placed in a chair. Piper put a tire iron across Poage's feet to prevent him from moving. When Poage regained consciousness, he pleaded with his attackers to let him go, but they refused. Instead, he was forced to drink beer containing crushed pills and hydrochloric acid. His ATM card was then taken from him by Page. The perpetrators then discussed their plan to murder Poage while they stood in front of him.

Poage was forced into his own vehicle, and was driven approximately seven miles to Higgins Gulch, a remote wooded area in the Black Hills. He was ordered out of the vehicle and pushed into thick snow. He was stripped naked, apart from his undershirt, shoes, and socks. Poage was then escorted downhill toward a small icy creek. During the walk, he was beaten repeatedly until he was forced to lie down in the creek, where he was attacked again. As Poage lay in the creek, he was stabbed in the neck by Page with a knife. The three men then decided it was time to kill him. Poage requested to be let into his vehicle so he could warm himself up. He said he preferred to bleed to death in the warmth, rather than freezing to death in the cold. Piper agreed to the request if he washed blood off his body first. As Poage washed himself, Piper changed his mind, and Poage was violently dragged back into the creek by the three men as they attempted to drown him. Poage was then finally killed by having rocks thrown at his head. Page later stated that he and Hoadley ended Poage's life by dropping several large rocks on his head. Piper's brief contends that he did not take part in the drowning attempt or stabbings. Piper argues that he had returned to Poage's vehicle as he was being killed. According to Piper, Hoadley was the one that threw the final rock which killed Poage, but at that point in time, Piper was not there to personally witness the murder. However, Piper allegedly admitted standing on Poage's neck to assist Hoadley in drowning him, and then reportedly stabbed Poage twice. Both Page and Hoadley admitted that they both dropped heavy rocks on Poage's head, actions which they believe are what finally killed him. Hours after the beatings first began, Poage was left for dead in the creek in the early hours of March 13. The men killed him because they did not want a witness to the robbery of his home.

Aftermath
Page, Piper, and Hoadley drove away from the scene in Poage's vehicle. They returned to his house and stole several items from the family home. Page claimed Poage's vehicle, as well as a stereo system and some clothes. The men then drove to visit Piper's sister in Hannibal, Missouri, hoping they could stay with her for a while. She refused to let them stay with her, so they headed back to South Dakota. They traveled to Rapid City, where they used Poage's ATM card to withdraw cash, and also sold some of his property. The three men then split up and went their separate ways, with Piper deciding to return to his home state of Alaska.

On April 22, 2000, a woman came across the remains of Poage in Higgins Gulch. A forensic pathologist identified the remains, and later confirmed the deceased man was Poage. It was determined that stab wounds and blunt force injury to the head were his cause of death. On April 25, police interviewed Hoadley, and he gave a statement detailing his involvement in the murder. He confessed to the crime, and gave police the names of his accomplices. Warrants were then issued for both Page and Piper, who had fled the state. Three days later, law enforcement located and arrested Page in Texas. Piper was tracked down in Alaska, and was arrested for first degree murder.

Page voluntarily described to authorities the details surrounding Poage's murder. Piper also gave a statement, and described Poage's torture and murder, as well as his participation in the crime. Both men were then subsequently extradited to South Dakota, and jailed in Lawrence County. Page and Piper later pleaded guilty to, and were convicted of, first degree felony murder. They were both sentenced to death, while Hoadley received a life sentence. Page was executed by lethal injection on July 11, 2007, while Piper remains on death row. He is the only person on death row in South Dakota.

Poage is buried at Norton Cemetery in his hometown of Norton, Kansas.

Perpetrators

Elijah Page

Elijah Page (December 1, 1981 – July 11, 2007) was born in Titusville, Florida. While he was still young, he moved with his family to Kansas City, Missouri. Page reportedly had a very troubled childhood. He lived with his family in abandoned buildings without heat or utilities. He was also allegedly sexually abused by his mother as a 2-year-old. 

Page pleaded guilty to Poage's death, and waived his right to have a jury determine his sentence. On February 16, 2001, he was sentenced to death by judge Warren Johnson.

By August 2006, Page ordered his attorney to stop all appeals, and just allow his execution to proceed. He reportedly said that he was tired of living the life of a condemned man. Page waived his appeals and sped up his execution. He was initially scheduled to be executed on August 29, 2006, but the execution was delayed by Governor Mike Rounds until at least July 1, 2007, over a technicality involving the execution drugs.

Page was executed by lethal injection at South Dakota State Penitentiary in Sioux Falls on July 11, 2007. He was the first person executed in South Dakota in over sixty years, and the first person executed in South Dakota since the state reinstated capital punishment in 1979. At the age of 25, Page is also the youngest person executed in South Dakota in the modern era, and no one younger than him has been executed in the United States since his execution. His last meal was steak, jalapeño peppers, onion rings, a salad, and ice cream. He had no final statement.

Briley Piper

Briley Wayne Piper (born March 20, 1980) grew up in Anchorage, Alaska. When he was 13, he was arrested for allegedly grabbing a woman and was also arrested for assault after robbing a classmate at knife point. Prosecutors argue Piper was the ringleader of the group and was good at manipulating people. Like Page, Piper pleaded guilty to Poage's death in January 2001, waiving his right to have a jury determine his sentence. Judge Warren Johnson sentenced him to death on January 19, 2001.

Piper appealed his conviction, and in 2009, the State Supreme Court overturned the death sentence, arguing that a jury should decide his fate. The jury sentenced him to death in August 2011, with the sentence being upheld in 2019. With the execution of Charles Russell Rhines on November 4, 2019, Piper is now the only person left on death row in South Dakota. He remains incarcerated at South Dakota State Penitentiary awaiting execution.

Darrell Hoadley

Darrell R. Hoadley (born November 5, 1979) was born in Laramie, Wyoming. Like Page and Piper, he had a difficult childhood and was abused by his mother and her male friends. By the time of the murder he was living in Lead, South Dakota, and had a daughter. Unlike Page and Piper, Hoadley did not waive his right to have a jury determine his sentence. He pleaded not guilty at his trial. After the jury deadlocked 8–4 in favor of life in prison, he was spared execution. Hoadley was sentenced to life in prison in 2001. He remains incarcerated at South Dakota State Penitentiary.

See also
 Capital punishment in South Dakota
 Capital punishment in the United States
 List of death row inmates in the United States
 List of people executed in South Dakota
 List of people executed in the United States in 2007
 List of solved missing person cases

References

External links
 

2000 in South Dakota
2000 murders in the United States
2000s missing person cases
Capital murder cases
Crimes in South Dakota
Deaths by person in South Dakota
Deaths by stabbing in the United States
Formerly missing people
Kidnappings in the United States
Male murder victims
March 2000 crimes
March 2000 events in the United States
Missing person cases in South Dakota
People murdered in South Dakota
Torture in the United States